The Dobrun Monastery is located in Bosnia and Herzegovina, 12 km away from town of Višegrad, in the gorge of the Rzav river near the border with Republic of Serbia. Dobrun Monastery is dedicated to the Dormition of the Virgin and was built in 1343 by Duke Pribil and his sons Stefan and Petar.

References

Serbian Orthodox monasteries in Bosnia and Herzegovina
Buildings and structures in Republika Srpska